This was the first edition of the tournament.

Diego Hidalgo and Cristian Rodríguez won the title after defeating Luciano Darderi and Andrea Vavassori 6–4, 7–6(7–5) in the final.

Seeds

Draw

References

External links
 Main draw

Viña Challenger - Doubles